Turtle Rock is a neighborhood in the south part of Irvine, Orange County, California, near Concordia University, Irvine and the University of California, Irvine. It is bounded to the north by University Drive and Mason Regional Park, to the east by the Strawberry Farms Golf Club and Ridgeline Drive, to the south by Shady Canyon Drive, and to the west by Culver Drive. Turtle Rock is one of the five "villages" originally forming Irvine; its 1967 founding is commemorated by a sculpture of a turtle in Turtle Rock Community Park, at the corner of Turtle Rock and Sunnyhill Drives. A two-lane internal loop road, Turtle Rock Drive, encircles the village and carries traffic between housing developments and the city's main streets.

Geographically, Turtle Rock lies in the San Joaquin Hills. The tallest point is a hill called "Sunset Point". Originally a nameless point, it was referenced as a part of Chaparral Park. It is often referred to as "Suicide Hill" online, due to the usage of the hill's steepest slope to perform the "Suicide" exercise routine. In 2021, the City Of Irvine conducted surveys and consulted with indigenous leaders, before officially naming the hill "Sunset Point". The highest point of Sunset Point is 161m tall. A lower peak to the north, also within the neighborhood, is called French Hill, with a peak of 128 meters.  While it is not entirely clear where the name "Turtle Rock" comes from, there is a rocky outcropping on Rockview Drive at the northern end of the neighborhood that is now maintained as part of an association park. This rock has the shape of the front of a turtle's carapace, and is sacred to the Gabrieleño Native Americans. It is often locally considered to be the origin of the name "Turtle Rock". 

Schools within Turtle Rock include  Turtle Rock Preschool, Turtle Rock Elementary School, Bonita Canyon Elementary School, University High School, and Concordia University.

Planning and housing issues within Turtle Rock have been discussed regularly in Southern California newspapers.
Henry Irving uses Turtle Rock as one of several test cases for analysis of urban communication.

References 

Villages of Irvine, California
San Joaquin Hills